Duraisamy is a surname. Notable people with the surname include:

Duraisamy Simon Lourdusamy (born 1924), Indian Cardinal of the Roman Catholic Church
B. Duraisamy, Indian politician, former Member of the Legislative Assembly of Tamil Nadu
P. Duraisamy, Indian politician, former Member of the Legislative Assembly of Tamil Nadu
R. Duraisamy, Indian politician, incumbent member of the Tamil Nadu Legislative Assembly
S. Duraisamy, Indian politician, former Member of the Legislative Assembly of Tamil Nadu
Saidai Sa. Duraisamy (born 1951), Indian Politician, incumbent Mayor of Corporation of Chennai
V. P. Duraisamy, Indian politician of the Dravida Munnetra Kazhagam, Member of the Legislative Assembly of Tamil Nadu

See also
Darisa
Dorisa
Dreisam

Indian surnames